Leucoptera celastrella is a moth in the family Lyonetiidae that is known from Japan (Hokkaido, Honshu, Kyushu).

Adults are on wing from the middle of May to the beginning of June. There are two generations per year.

The larvae feed on Tripterygium regelii, Celastrus orbiculatus and Euonymus alatus. They mine the leaves of their host plant. The mine has the form of a blotch mine or sometimes an upper surface digitate-blotch. It is pale green or pale brownish-green. One to several larvae may occupy a single mine. The frass consists of pale brown to blackish grains gathered in the central area. Pupation takes place outside of the mine in a white spindle-shaped cocoon with a H-shaped silken roof. The cocoon is mostly made on the surface of a dead leaf.

External links

Leucoptera (moth)
Moths described in 1964
Endemic fauna of Japan
Moths of Japan